"Ámame una Vez Más" (also subtitled as "La Última Luna") is a song performed by Amanda Miguel on her 1996 studio album of the same name. It was co-written by Anahí (not to be confused with the RBD member of the same name) and produced by her husband Diego Verdaguer. The album remarked the return of Amanda Miguel following more than a five-year hiatus. "Ámame una Vez Más" won the Billboard Latin Music Award for Latin Pop Song of the Year in 1997 and was recognized as one of the award-winning songs at the ASCAP Latin Awards in the same year. It was also nominated for Pop Song of the Year at the 8th Annual Lo Nuestro Awards in 1997.

Charts

Weekly charts

Year-end charts

See also
List of Billboard Latin Pop Airplay number ones of 1996

References

1996 singles
1996 songs
Amanda Miguel songs
1990s ballads
Pop ballads
Spanish-language songs